Harry Dent may refer to:

 Harry S. Dent Sr. (1930–2007), American political strategist
 Harry Dent (Harry S. Dent, Jr., born 1953), American financial newsletter writer
 Harold Dent (1894–1995), wartime editor of the Times Educational Supplement